Manuel Pinto (25 December 1938 – 14 April 2008) was a member of the Parliament of Uganda where he served on various statutory committees and committees, he was a government minister from 1993 to 1995 and the first director general of the commission on AIDS in Uganda from 1992 to 1995. Pinto was Chief Scout of Uganda and served as the Chairman of the Africa Scout Committee.

Background
He died in Nsambya after a car accident.

In 2003, Pinto was awarded the 297th Bronze Wolf, the only distinction of the World Organization of the Scout Movement, awarded by the World Scout Committee for exceptional services to world Scouting.

External links

References

1938 births
2008 deaths
Recipients of the Bronze Wolf Award
Scouting and Guiding in Uganda